Modbury is a suburb of Adelaide, South Australia in the City of Tea Tree Gully. Modbury is located at the end of the Adelaide O-Bahn and is home to the Tea Tree Plaza shopping complex and a Hospital.

It was named Modbury by R. S. Kelly, on 1 September 1840, after his native town in Devonshire.

Schools
The suburb of Modbury contains one high school (Modbury High School) and one Primary School (Modbury West). However, there are many other schools in the surrounding areas which also bear the name Modbury. Modbury South Primary for example is located in the suburb of Hope Valley. There is also another primary school named Modbury School which was originally in Modbury proper but relocated in the 1970s to what is now known as Modbury North.

Government
The suburb of Modbury is located within the Australian House of Representatives Seat of Makin, and the South Australian House of Assembly Seat of Florey.

Its local government area is the City of Tea Tree Gully and its chambers are located within the suburb.

Sport and recreation 

There are many sporting teams in Modbury - Modbury Hawks (Australian rules football), Modbury Jets (Soccer), Modbury Tennis Club and Modbury Bowling Club.

A large park central in the suburb is known as Civic Park it is located across the road from Tea Tree Plaza. It is a popular spot for barbecues and picnics in summer.

Transport

The O'Bahn buses and other buses serve Modbury.

References

Suburbs of Adelaide